The Deanery of Barnstaple  in north Devon is one of the deaneries of the Archdeaconry of Barnstaple, one of the archdeaconries of the Church of England Diocese of Exeter. The rural dean is Giles King-Smith.

Benefice of Barnstaple Team Ministry 
Parishes:
Pilton (St Mary the Virgin) with Ashford (St Peter)
Barnstaple (St Peter and St Mary Magdalene)
Barnstaple (Holy Trinity)
Bishops Tawton (St John the Baptist)
Goodleigh (St Gregory)
Newport (St John the Baptist)
Sticklepath with Roundswell, Barnstaple (St Paul)

Clergy:
 Nigel Dilkes – Community Priest and Pioneer Minister with responsibility for children and families work (Pilton with Ashford)
 David Fletcher – Community Priest and Town Centre Chaplain (Barnstaple St Peter)
 Guy Chave-Cox – Team Vicar (Sticklepath)
 S May – Community Priest and Pioneer Minister with responsibility for mission enabling (Barnstaple Holy Trinity with Goodleigh)
 Andy Dodwell – Curate-in-charge and Pioneer Minister for Discipleship Development (Newport & Bishop's Tawton)

Benefice of Braunton (St Brannock) with Saunton (St Anne) 
Clergy:
 Ann Thorne – Priest-in-Charge

Benefice of Fremington (St Peter) with Bickington (St Andrew)
Clergy:
 Paul Hockey – Vicar

Benefice of Georgeham (St George) with Croyde (St Mary Magdalene)
Clergy:
 Mike Newbon – Priest-in-Charge
 S Oldham – Curate

Benefice of Heanton Punchardon (St Augustine) with Marwood (St Michael and All Angels), in a mission community with West Down (St Calixtus)
Clergy:
Iain Robertson – Priest in Charge 
M Cranston – Community Priest

Benefice of Ilfracombe Team Ministry
Parishes:
Ilfracombe (Holy Trinity) with Ilfracombe (St Peter)
Lee (St Matthew)
Woolacombe (St Sabinus)
Bittadon (St Peter)
Mortehoe (St Mary Magdalene)

Clergy:
 R Harris – Team Rector (Ilfracombe Holy Trinity)
 G King-Smith – Team Vicar (Woolacombe)

Benefice of Ilfracombe (St Philip and St James) 
Clergy:
 M Rogers – Priest-in-Charge

Diocese of Exeter
Deaneries of the Church of England